Inland island may refer to:
 Lake island, a landmass within a lake
 River island, any exposed land surrounded by river water

See also
List of Cambodian inland islands
List of inland islands of Ireland

Islands by type